Morris Jones may refer to:

Morris Jones (television journalist), American television journalist
Morris Jones (footballer) (1919–1993), English footballer

See also
Henry Morris-Jones (1884–1972), Welsh doctor, soldier, politician
John Morris-Jones (1864–1929), Welsh grammarian, academic and Welsh-language poet
Maurice Jones (disambiguation)